A product defect is any characteristic of a product which hinders its usability for the purpose for which it was designed and manufactured.

Product defects arise most prominently in legal contexts regarding product safety, where the term is applied to "anything that renders the product not reasonably safe". The field of law that addresses injuries caused by defective products is called product liability.

A wide range of circumstances can render a product defective. The product may have a design defect or design flaw, resulting from the product having been poorly designed or tested, so that the design itself yields a product that can not perform its desired function. Even if the design is correct, the product may have a manufacturing defect if it was incorrectly manufactured, for example if the wrong materials are used. A product may also be considered legally defective if it lacks appropriate instructions for its use, or appropriate warnings of dangers accompanying normal use or misuse of the product.

Depending on the given jurisdiction, the failure of a consumer to read the available warnings may negate causation for purposes of a defective or inadequate warning claim in a product liability suit.  

A product that is defective in some way that does not render it dangerous might still be sold, with a discounted price reflecting the defect. For example, where a clothing manufacturer's inspection discovers that a line of shirts have been made with slightly uneven sleeves, the manufacturer may choose to sell these shirts at a discount, often through an outlet store and with the label cut off to indicate that the quality is not intended to reflect on the brand. For some products, rework is appropriate.

Product quality risk in supply chain
Product quality risk in supply chain focuses on the quality problems in the supply chain context rather in the manufacturing quality context. Tse and Tan (2009)  identified the concept of “Product Quality Risk in Supply Chain” as:

Inherent quality problems (i.e. raw materials / ingredients / production / logistics / packaging) in any of the supply members trigger a domino effect that spread through a multi-tier supply network. For this reason, it is hard for a network member to keep track of who did what, and when, to the final quality of the products. The product that a focal firm sells to the consumer comprises components made by the focal firm and the suppliers. When the product breaks down due to defects in either the firm’s component or the supplier’s component, the firm has to bear the consequences.

In practice
Thus, product quality risk is an inherent part of the supply chain risks. In other words, it tends to comprise some or all of the risk elements, such as operational risk, disruption risk and reputational risk. For example, when lead was found in their toys, it tarnished Mattel’s reputation, and disrupted the supply of its products in the market.

In the literature, the concept of product quality risk has not been fully investigated. Although Zsidisim stated that quality risk includes the risk of producing unsafe products that can harm the consumer, even when these defects are caused by another firm or inherited from a sub-contractor. However, neither PQR nor its domino effect in the supply chain have been thoroughly studied.

The product quality risk in global supply chain concept, though similar to "product harm crisis" (defined as defective or dangerous products) (Dawar & Pillutla, 2000) and "moral hazard problem" (defined as the outcome of asymmetric information, imperfect observability in supplier's quality) (Hwang et al., 2006), are not about the risk of product quality in a global supply chain context.

See also 
 Product recall

References

Quality management
Business law
Product liability